Kis is an Oceanic language of northeast New Guinea. It is spoken to the southeast of Samap village in Turubu Rural LLG, East Sepik Province.

References

Schouten languages
Languages of East Sepik Province